Adel Ferdosipour (born 3 October 1974) is an Iranian journalist, football commentator, translator, university professor, and television show host and producer. He was the host and producer of the popular TV show Navad.
He is producer of the popular TV show Football 120.

Life
Ferdosipour was born on 3 October 1974 in Rafsanjan, Kerman province. Ferdosipour attended Zoghi Elementary School, before graduating to attend Alborz High School. He received his master's degree in industrial engineering from Sharif University of Technology. Adel is a close friend of Ali Daei as they both attended the same university. He is a member and the captain of celebrities team in Iran.
Ferdosipour voted for Mir Hossein Mousavi in the 2009 Iranian presidential elections.

Performances

TV programs

Internet programs

Film

Theatre

Popularity
Adel Ferdosipour is considered to be one of the most popular public figures in Iran, due to his honesty, sincerity, his unique kind of reportage and even questioning and disagreeing with high authority officials. His program, which airs on Monday nights, has an audience of over 30 million (40 million has also been stated by some sources). Newsweek Magazine considered Ferdosipour among 20 powerful persons of Iran in 2009 because of his widespread popularity.

See also 
 List of Sharif University of Technology people

References

External links 
 Program 90 website
 Adel Ferdowsi-Pour's interview in Durahmi program (Aparat)

1974 births
Living people
People from Kerman
Iranian journalists
Iranian television personalities
Sharif University of Technology alumni
Iranian industrial engineers
People from Kerman Province
Iranian radio and television presenters